Floral Hall can refer to:

In the United Kingdom
 Paul Hamlyn Hall, the former Covent Garden floral hall in London, England
 Hornsea Floral Hall, Hornsea, East Riding of Yorkshire
 Floral Hall, former theatre in Scarborough, North Yorkshire
 Floral Hall, a former events venue in the grounds of Belfast Zoo.

In the United States
 Floral Hall (Harlan, Iowa), listed on the NRHP in Iowa
 Floral Hall (Tipton, Iowa), listed on the NRHP in Iowa
 Floral Hall (Portland, Indiana), listed on the NRHP in Indiana
 Floral Hall (Lexington, Kentucky), listed on the NRHP in Kentucky
 Floral Hall (Bowling Green, Ohio), listed on the NRHP in Ohio
 Floral Hall (Mount Gilead, Ohio), listed on the NRHP in Ohio
 Floral Hall (Everett, Washington), listed on the NRHP in Washington

Architectural disambiguation pages